Wild Goose may refer to:
Non-domesticated goose
Wild Goose, Ontario, a community of the township of Shuniah, Ontario, Canada
Wild Goose (beer), a brand of beer of the Logan Shaw Brewing Company
Greylag goose, or wild goose
The Wild Goose, a hand-written newspaper created in 1867 by Fenian prisoners 
HMS Wild Goose (U45), a 1942 Royal Navy Black Swan-class sloop
USS Wild Goose (SP-562), a US Navy patrol vessel in commission from 1917 to 1920 
USS YMS-328, later Wild Goose, a US Navy minesweeper converted to a yacht, once owned by John Wayne
The Wild Goose (film), a 1921 American film directed by Albert Capellani
The Cry of the Wild Goose, a 1950 popular song performed by Frankie Laine

See also
Wild Goose Café, a charity project in Bristol, England, United Kingdom
Wild Goose Festival, a 4-day festival at the intersection of justice, spirituality, music and art.
Giant Wild Goose Pagoda, a Buddhist pagoda in Xi'an, Shaanxi, China
Small Wild Goose Pagoda, a pagoda in Xi'an, China
USS Wild Goose II (SP-891), a US Navy patrol vessel in service from 1917 to 1920 
Wild Goose Publishing, the publishing group of Iona Community
Wild Geese (disambiguation)
Wild-goose chase (disambiguation)
Goose (disambiguation)
Wild Goose Soaps, A handcrafted soap company based in India